Roberto Triulzi (born June 3, 1965, in Samedan, Graubünden) is a Swiss former professional ice hockey winger. From season 2002/03 to season 2005/06 he was sports director of the SC Bern.

Achievements

1987 - NLA Champion with HC Lugano
1988 - NLA Champion with HC Lugano
1989 - NLA Champion with SC Bern
1991 - NLA Champion with SC Bern
1992 - NLA Champion with SC Bern
1997 - NLA Champion with SC Bern

International play

Roberto Triulzi played a total of 109 games for the Swiss national team.

External links
Triulzi on hockeyfans.ch
 

1965 births
Living people
EHC Biel players
HC Lugano players
Swiss ice hockey forwards
SC Bern players
Sportspeople from Graubünden